Lucas Fernandes Mariano (born 24 September 1993) is a Brazilian basketball player who plays for Franca of the NBB.

Youth career
Born in Planaltina, Lucas moved with his family to Franca when he was just five years old. Encouraged by his mother, a former professional athlete with passages through Brasília, Ponta Grossa and Franca, Lucas began his career in basketball at Escola Lance Livre, aged just seven. At age 11, he joined the ASPA (Association of Parents and Friends of Franca Basketball), which serves as the base for Franca.

Professional career

In the first seasons for the professional team, Lucas had little time on the court, often not even leaving the bench. The situation changed in the 2012–13 season, when Lula Ferreira replaced Hélio Rubens in charge of the Franca team. Lula took on the challenge of renewing the group and betting on the base. Eventually, Mariano became one of the team's top players and one of Brazil's most promising young players.

Lucas faced major complications at the beginning of the following season in the middle of the quarterfinals of the Campeonato Paulista, he lost his younger brother, in the next game of the series Lucas was dismissed and his brother was honored with a minute of silence.The 2014–15 season marked Lucas' maturity in the Franca team. Alongside Léo Meindl, he led Franca to the semifinals in the Campeonato Paulista and fifth place in the 2014–15 NBB qualifying phase, guaranteeing a place for the club in the 2015 LSB champion.

Signed by Mogi das Cruzes for the 2015–16 season, Lucas was officially presented in July. Three months later, he played in his first final for Mogi, being defeated by São José and taking the vice-championship in Campeonato Paulista.Mogi would end up eliminated in the NBB Playoffs. After leaving Mogi das Cruzes, Mariano played for Lobos Brasília and he was considered at the time one of the best centers in the league. Later agreeing to play for Vasco da Gama, then Bauru and Botafogo.

According to the websites, Mariano's performance during the 2020-21 Novo Basquete Brasil season was the best of his career.
Rightly, Lucas Mariano was named the league's MVP ahead of Georginho and Lucas Dias.
Lucas averaged 19.8 points, 7.4 rebounds at 20.1 efficiency.
During his MVP season, he mostly played the center position.
With São Paulo, he became the league's vice champion.
Lucas Mariano was also selected for the league's first team alongside Georginho, Lucas Dias, and Marquinhos and David Jackson.

After his return to Franca in 2021, in his first six games he was already his team's top scorer in the Campeonato Paulista and the second highest scorer in the competition, with an average of 20.3 points per game. He led his team to a 5-1 initial record with its sole loss to São Paulo.Mariano and his team would finish as champions in the 2021–22 NBB season.

National team
He has been a member of the Brazilian national basketball team since he was young. Lucas was called up for Brazil team for the 2016 South American Basketball Championship, 2017 FIBA AmeriCup and 2022 FIBA AmeriCup, winning two silver medal with Brazil in the process.

Career statistics

NBB

Regular season

Playoffs

LDB

Regular season

Playoffs

Personal
Mariano's mother was a professional basketball player, also for Franca, while his father was a handball player. He has two younger brothers, one who passed away and the other who plays for Franca's youth team.

He lost one of his younger brother to drowning during the 2014-15 season, an event that deeply affected him.

Lucas admires NBA basketball player DeMarcus Cousins, even saying that their styles are alike.

References

External links
FIBA Profile 
Champions League Profile
Latinbasket.com Profile
RealGM.com Profile
Proballers.com Profile
NBB Profile 

1993 births
Living people
Brazilian men's basketball players
Centers (basketball)
Sportspeople from Goiás
Power forwards (basketball)
São Paulo FC basketball players
Franca Basquetebol Clube players